Sandugach (Handuğas) is a rural locality (a selo) and the administrative centre of Sandugachevsky Selsoviet, Yanaulsky District, Bashkortostan, Russia. The population was 431 as of 2010. There are 9 streets.

Geography 
Sandugach is located 19 km east of Yanaul (the district's administrative centre) by road. Barabanovka is the nearest rural locality.

References 

Rural localities in Yanaulsky District